San Antonio Los Ranchos is a municipality in the Chalatenango department of El Salvador. 

Municipalities of the Chalatenango Department